The 2022 United States House of Representatives elections in Illinois were held on November 8, 2022, to elect the 17 U.S. representatives from Illinois, one from each of the state's 17 congressional districts (reduced from 18 in the redistricting cycle following the 2020 United States Census). The elections coincided with the 2022 U.S. Senate race in Illinois, as well as other elections to the House of Representatives, other elections to the United States Senate and various state and local elections. On November 23, 2021, Governor J.B. Pritzker signed the Illinois Congressional Redistricting Act of 2021, which established the new boundaries of the districts, into law. FiveThirtyEight ranked Illinois as the most gerrymandered Democrat-run state following 2022 redistricting.

Results summary

Statewide

District 1

Before the 2020 redistricting cycle, the 1st district was primarily based in the South Side of Chicago. Under the new congressional map, although the 1st district is still based in Chicago, including portions of Bronzeville, Hyde Park, Grand Crossing, Morgan Park, and Roseland, it now reaches down to the southwest and takes in a collection of exurban and rural areas in Cook County and Will County, almost reaching Kankakee County. The former section is heavily black and the latter is heavily white; as a result, the district as a whole is slightly over 50% black. The incumbent is Democrat Bobby Rush, who was re-elected with 73.8% of the vote in 2020. On January 3, 2022, Rush announced that he would retire rather than seek a sixteenth term in office.

Democratic primary

Candidates

Nominee 

 Jonathan Jackson, business professor; spokesperson for the Rainbow/PUSH coalition and son of Jesse Jackson

Eliminated in primary
Kirby Birgans, educator and advocate
Chris Butler, pastor
Jahmal Cole, founder of My Block, My Hood, My City
Jacqueline Collins, state senator
Steven DeJoie, consultant and restaurateur
Pat Dowell, Chicago City Council member
Cassandra Goodrum, Professor of Criminal Justice at Chicago State University
Marcus Lewis, minister
Ameena Matthews, anti-violence activist, subject of The Interrupters, and candidate for this district in 2020
Karin Norington-Reaves, attorney and CEO of the Chicago Cook Workforce Partnership
Robert Palmer, educator
Terre Layng Rosner, Professor of Communication at the University of St. Francis
Jonathan Swain, businessman and former chair of the Chicago Zoning Board of Appeals
Michael Thompson, educator
Charise Williams, former deputy director of the Illinois Criminal Justice Information Authority

Results

Republican primary

Candidates

Nominee
Eric Carlson, Army Veteran

Eliminated in primary
Jeff Regnier, New Lenox businessman
Philanise White
Geno Young, musician

Results

Results

District 2

The incumbent is Democrat Robin Kelly, who was re-elected with 78.8% of the vote in 2020.

Democratic primary

Candidates

Nominee
 Robin Kelly, incumbent U.S. Representative

Endorsements

Results

Republican primary

Nominee
 Thomas Lynch, former Iroquois County Board member

Eliminated in primary
 Shane Cultra, former state senator (2011–2013)
 Ashley Ramos

Results

General election

Predictions

Results

District 3

During the 2020 redistricting process, the Illinois General Assembly decided to create a second Latino-influenced district. As such, the 3rd congressional district has no incumbent. The district is approximately 47% Latino and unites heavily Latino communities from Chicago to Elgin. Among potential voters, the communities in the district include 63.4% White, 25.2% Latino, 6.2% Black, and 4.7% Asian people. It includes parts of the Chicago neighborhoods of West Town, Logan Square, Humboldt Park, Belmont Cragin, Portage Park, Irving Park, Albany Park, Montclare, Dunning, and all or parts of the suburbs of Elmwood Park, River Grove, Franklin Park, Bensenville, Elk Grove Village, Wood Dale, Addison, Glendale Heights, Wheaton, West Chicago, Wayne, Bartlett, Hanover Park, and Elgin.

Democratic primary

Candidates

Nominee
Delia Ramirez, state representative

Eliminated in primary
Juan Aguirre
Iymen Chehade, professor of history at the Columbia College of Chicago and School of the Art Institute of Chicago
Gilbert Villegas, Chicago City Council member

Declined
Omar Aquino, state senator (endorsed Ramirez)

Endorsements

Polling

Results

Republican primary

Candidates

Nominee
Justin Burau, real estate consultant

Endorsements

Results

General election

Predictions

Results

District 4

The incumbent is Democrat Jesús "Chuy" García, who was re-elected with 84.1% of the vote in 2020.

Democratic primary

Candidates

Nominee
Jesús "Chuy" García, incumbent U.S. Representative

Declined
Marie Newman, incumbent U.S. Representative (unsuccessfully ran in the 6th district)

Endorsements

Results

Republican primary

Candidates

Nominee
James Falakos, Businessman

Results

Working Class Party

Nominee
 Ed Hershey

General election

Predictions

Results

District 5

The incumbent is Democrat Mike Quigley, who was re-elected with 70.8% of the vote in 2020.

Democratic primary

Candidates

Nominee
 Mike Quigley, incumbent U.S. Representative

Removed from ballot
 Raleigh Bowman, manager

Withdrawn
 Hoan Huynh, entrepreneur and investor (running for state house)

Endorsements

Results

Republican primary

Candidates

Nominee
 Tommy Hanson, Republican nominee for IL-05 in 2008, 2018, and 2020

Eliminated in primary
 Malgorzata McGonigal

Results

Independents
 Jerico Matias Cruz, U.S. Army Special Operations combat veteran

General election

Predictions

Results

District 6

Due to redistricting, the borders of several districts in the Chicago area changed dramatically. 3rd District Incumbent Marie Newman was drawn into the Latino-majority 4th District.  As a result, Newman decided to switch to the redrawn 6th district and announced that she would be running against 6th district incumbent Sean Casten. The new district contains about 40% of Newman's old district and about 25% of Casten's. In the opening stages of the campaign both Casten and Newman declared an intent to run on their legislative records, and declared that they would not campaign negatively against each other.

Democratic primary

Candidates

Nominee
Sean Casten, incumbent U.S. Representative

Eliminated in primary
Charles Hughes, candidate for Illinois's 3rd congressional district in 2020
Marie Newman, incumbent U.S. Representative

Endorsements

Polling

Results

Republican primary

Candidates

Nominee
 Keith Pekau, mayor of Orland Park

Eliminated in primary
 Niki Conforti, businesswoman
 Rob Cruz, member of the Oak Lawn Community High School District 229 Board of Education.
 Gary Grasso, mayor of Burr Ridge, candidate for Attorney General of Illinois in 2018
 Scott Kaspar, Orland Park attorney
 Catherine O'Shea, Oak Lawn real estate agent and candidate for Illinois's 3rd congressional district in 2020

Withdrawn
 Justin Burau, real estate consultant (running in the 3rd district)

Endorsements

Results

Independents

Declined
 Dan Lipinski, former Democratic U.S. Representative from Illinois's 3rd congressional district (2005–2021)

General election

Predictions

Results

District 7

The incumbent is Democrat Danny Davis, who was re-elected with 80.4% of the vote in 2020. He is running for re-election.

Democratic primary

Candidates

Nominee
Danny Davis, incumbent U.S. Representative

Eliminated in primary
Kina Collins, activist and candidate in 2020
Denarvis Mendenhall, veteran and FDA investigator

Endorsements

Results

General election

Predictions

Results

District 8

The incumbent is Democrat Raja Krishnamoorthi, who was re-elected with 73.2% of the vote in 2020.

Democratic primary

Candidates

Nominee
Raja Krishnamoorthi, incumbent U.S. Representative

Eliminated in primary
 Junaid Ahmed, community activist

Endorsements

Results

Republican primary

Candidates

Nominee
 Chris Dargis, Ukrainian-American retired Navy officer and businessman

Eliminated in primary
 Karen Kolodziej
 Chad Koppie, former trustee of the Kane County Regional Board of Schools and perennial candidate
 Peter Kopsaftis, businessman and Barrington Township Republican committeeman
 Phillip Wood

Results

General election

Predictions

Polling

Results

District 9

The incumbent is Democrat Jan Schakowsky, who was re-elected with 71.0% of the vote in 2020.

Democratic primary

Candidates

Nominee
Jan Schakowsky, incumbent U.S. Representative

Results

Endorsements

Republican primary

Candidates

Nominee
 Max Rice, candidate for IL-9 in 2018

Results

General election

Predictions

Results

District 10

The incumbent is Democrat Brad Schneider, who was re-elected with 63.9% of the vote in 2020.

Democratic primary

Candidates

Nominee
Brad Schneider, incumbent U.S. Representative

Endorsements

Results

Republican primary

Candidates

Nominee
 Joseph Severino, Businessman

Results

General election

Predictions

Polling

Results

District 11

The incumbent is Democrat Bill Foster, who was re-elected with 63.3% of the vote in 2020.

Democratic primary

Candidates

Nominee
Bill Foster, incumbent U.S. Representative

Endorsements

Results

Republican primary

Candidates

Nominee
 Catalina Lauf, former advisor at the U.S. Department of Commerce and candidate for the Republican nomination for Illinois's 14th congressional district in the 2020

Eliminated in primary
 Mark Carroll
 Jerry Evans, music teacher
 Susan Hathaway-Altman
 Andrea Heeg
 Cassandra Tanner Miller, domestic violence advocate

Withdrew
 Juan Ramos

Endorsements

Results

General election

Predictions

Results

District 12

The incumbents are Republican Mike Bost, who was re-elected with 60.4% of the vote in 2020, and Republican Mary Miller who was redistricted from the 15th Congressional District.

Republican primary

Candidates

Nominee
Mike Bost, incumbent U.S. Representative

Declined
Mary Miller, incumbent U.S. Representative (running in IL15)

Endorsements

Results

Democratic primary

Candidates

Nominee
 Chip Markel, U.S. Navy Veteran

Eliminated in primary
 Joshua Qualls

Results

General election

Predictions

Results

District 13

Due to redistricting, the 13th congressional district was created as a new seat, with no incumbent.

Republican primary

Candidates

Nominee
 Regan Deering, former chair of the Decatur Public Schools Foundation

Eliminated in primary
 Matt Hausman
 Terry Martin
 Jesse Reising, former federal prosecutor

Endorsements

Results

Democratic primary

Candidates

Nominee
Nikki Budzinski, former U.S. Office of Management and Budget chief of staff and former senior advisor to governor J. B. Pritzker

Eliminated in primary
David Palmer, financial planner

Removed from ballot
 Ellis Everett Taylor

Endorsements

Results

General election

Predictions

Polling

Results

District 14

The incumbent is Democrat Lauren Underwood, who was re-elected with 50.7% of the vote in 2020. The 14th district as drawn during the 2020 redistricting cycle includes all or parts of Aurora, DeKalb, Granville, Joliet, Montgomery, Naperville, Oswego, Ottawa, Peru, Plainfield, Shorewood, Spring Valley, Sugar Grove, and Sycamore.

Democratic primary

Candidates

Nominee
Lauren Underwood, incumbent U.S. Representative

Endorsements

Results

Republican primary

Candidates

Nominee
Scott Gryder, chair of the Kendall County Board

Eliminated in primary
Michael Koolidge, former radio host
Jack Lombardi
James Marter, perennial candidate, software consultant, and chair of the Kendall County Republican Central Committee
 Jaime Milton

Endorsements

Results

General election

Predictions

Results

District 15

Incumbent Republican Mary Miller currently represents the 15th congressional district, and is running for re-election in the district. Due to redistricting, Republican Rodney Davis, who represents the 13th congressional district, resides in the 15th district and has opted to run in the new 15th district rather than the more Democratic 13th. The new 15th district, located in western and central Illinois, includes all or parts of Adams, Bond, Brown, Calhoun, Cass, Coles, DeWitt, Edgar, Greene, Hancock, Henderson, Jersey, Logan, Macon, Madison, Mercer, Menard, Montgomery, Morgan, Pike, Sangamon, Schuyler, Scott, Shelby, Christian, Vermillion, and Warren counties.

Republican primary

Candidates

Nominee
Mary Miller, incumbent U.S. Representative

Eliminated in primary
Rodney Davis, incumbent U.S. Representative

Endorsements

Polling

Results

Democratic primary

Candidates

Nominee
 Paul Lange, Commodity Broker

Results

General election

Predictions

Results

District 16

The incumbents are Republican Adam Kinzinger, who was re-elected with 64.7% of the vote in 2020, and Republican Darin LaHood who was redistricted from the 18th Congressional District. Kinzinger chose to retire, while LaHood chose to run in his new district.

Republican primary

Candidates

Nominee
Darin LaHood, incumbent U.S. Representative.

Eliminated in primary
 JoAnne Guillemette
 Walt Peters
Michael Rebresh, truck driver

Withdrew
Gene Koprowski, former official at the Heartland Institute
Catalina Lauf, nutritional company adviser (Running in District 11)
Jack Lombardi (Running in District 14)
James Marter, software consultant (Running in District 14)
Teresa Pfaff, home improvement worker (Running in District 17)
Geno Young, musician (Running in District 1)

Declined
Adam Kinzinger, incumbent U.S. Representative

Endorsements

Results

Democratic nominee 
Elizabeth Haderlein, Harvard city councillor

Endorsements

General election

Predictions

Results

District 17

The incumbent is Democrat Cheri Bustos, who was re-elected with 52.0% of the vote in 2020. She is not seeking re-election in 2022.

The new 17th was drawn to be more Democratic-leaning than its predecessor. The new district contains nearly all of its Democratic-leaning urban portions of its former territory, while most of the Republican-leaning areas of the old 17th were drawn into the neighboring 15th and 16th districts. Had the new 17th existed in the 2020 election, Joe Biden would have carried it by eight points, whereas Donald Trump carried the old 17th by two points in 2020.

Democratic primary

Candidates

Nominee
Eric Sorensen, former meteorologist

Eliminated in primary
Jonathan Logemann, Afghanistan veteran and Rockford alderman from the 2nd ward
Jacqueline McGowan, cannabis lobbyist, 2021 California gubernatorial recall election candidate
Angie Normoyle, Rock Island County Board member
Litesa Wallace, former state representative and candidate for Lieutenant Governor in 2018
Marsha Williams, chair of the Minooka Alumni Association

Declined
Cheri Bustos, incumbent U.S. Representative

Disqualified
Linda McNeely, Rockford alderman from the 13th ward

Endorsements

Polling

Results

Republican primary

Candidates

Nominee
Esther Joy King, nominee for Illinois's 17th congressional district in 2020

Eliminated in primary
Charlie Hemlick

Endorsements

Results

General election

Predictions

Polling 

Generic Democrat vs. generic Republican

Results

Notes

Partisan clients

References

External links
 Illinois State Board of Elections

2022
Illinois
United States House of Representatives